Thomas Percy was a medieval Bishop of Norwich. He was the son of Henry de Percy, 2nd Baron Percy and Idonia, daughter of Robert de Clifford, 1st Baron de Clifford.

Percy was nominated 4 February 1355 and was consecrated on 3 January 1356. He died on 8 August 1369.

Citations

References

 

Bishops of Norwich
1320s births
1369 deaths
14th-century English Roman Catholic bishops
Thomas
Younger sons of barons